General Stores and Mold Loft Building-Harriman Yard of the Merchant Shipbuilding Corporation, also known as Manhattan Soap Company Warehouse, is a historic warehouse located at Bristol, Bucks County, Pennsylvania. It was built in 1917, and is a three-story, rectangular reinforced concrete building.  The warehouse building was one of a complex of approximately 30 buildings constructed by the Merchant Shipbuilding Corporation at Harriman Yard during World War I.  In 1925, it was acquired by the Manhattan Soap Company, which was acquired by the Purex Corporation in 1956.  It was later used as a manufacturing facility for Dial soap until 2000.

It was added to the National Register of Historic Places in 2003.

References

Industrial buildings and structures on the National Register of Historic Places in Pennsylvania
Industrial buildings completed in 1917
Buildings and structures in Bucks County, Pennsylvania
National Register of Historic Places in Bucks County, Pennsylvania